Sitiawan Bypass, Federal Route 60, is a highway bypass in Manjung district, Perak, Malaysia.

List of junctions and towns

References
 Malaysia Road Atlas
 World Express Mapping

Highways in Malaysia